Novi Brown is an American actress. She is starring as Sabrina Hollins in the BET comedy-drama series, Sistas.

Life and career
Brown was born in Berlin, Germany and spent the first years of life between the United States and Germany. She attended the City College of New York and began her acting career appearing in theatre productions of The Vagina Monologues, Dutchman and Boston Marriage. She made her first screen appearance in the 2014 made-for-television film, My Dad's a Soccer Mom. In 2019, she began starring as Sabrina Hollins in the BET comedy-drama series, Sistas.

In 2022, Brown played the leading roles in three films: the horror thriller Alone in the Dark for Tubi, the romantic comedy The First Noelle, and the holiday comedy Holiday Hideaway opposite Vivica A. Fox for BET+.

Filmography

Film

Television

References

External links

Living people
21st-century American actresses
American film actresses
American television actresses
City College of New York alumni
Year of birth missing (living people)